David Feldman (born 20 December 1977, in Rio de Janeiro) is a Brazilian-Israeli Jazz and Bossa Nova pianist, arranger, producer, composer and sound-engineer.

Early life
David Feldman was born in a family of classical and early-music musicians. He studied with Ileana Carneiro, :pt:Sheila Zagury, and Luiz Eça.

New York
In 2000, Feldman enrolled at The New School for Jazz and Contemporary Music in New York, graduating in 2002. He worked with Slide Hampton and Claudio Roditi, was invited to sit in at the Mingus Big Band and worked with Duduka da Fonseca and Anat Cohen at Duduka's NY Samba Jazz Group, Matt Garrison and Eli Degibri.

Back to Rio
In 2004, he was semi-finalist of the Solo Piano Competition at Montreux Jazz Festival. In Brasil, he plays with Leny Andrade, Leila Pinheiro, and also has plaid in duos with veterans Paulo Moura and Leo Gandelman.
Feldman collaborates with the Brazilian NY based drummer Duduka da Fonseca, is the pianist in Duduka's trio with excellent critic reviews, and incorporates Duduka as the drummer of the David Feldman Trio in New York.

Feldman released in 2009 his first album "O Som do Beco Das Garrafas", very well received by the critics. Since then he has performed in jazz festivals in Brasil and overseas, having performed more than four times at the Festival Internacional de Jazz de Punta del Este, where in 2014 he had clarinetist/saxophonist Paquito D’Rivera as special guest. A video of that show can be seen here, in which David and Paquito play David's original tune "Esqueçeram de mim no aeroporto" with André Vasconcellos on bass, :pt:Márcio Bahia on drums , Frank Basile on Baritone sax and Diego Urcola on trumpet.

Feldman's solo disc "piano" from 2014 was also received well by the critics.

In September 2016 Feldman released the Horizonte album, with seven original songs. Per Mauro Ferreira "Horizonte confirms the carioca pianist as one of the great talents of today's Brazilian instrumental music". According to Dan Bilawsky, who gave Horizonte 4.5 stars out of 5 in his review on All About Jazz "While Feldman's decision to remain in Rio de Janeiro has kept him slightly off the radar, this album is a brilliant blip that should register with Brazilian jazz lovers near and far. Feldman's composing chops take center stage, his piano playing—alternately ruminative and animated—delights, and his crafting of a strong group dynamic speaks volumes about his leadership"

In April 2018, Feldman's participation in Duduka Da Fonseca's "Plays Dom Salvador", which received a 4-star rating from DownBeat's June 2018 edition, does an "admirable job of fleshing out the harmony in Salvador’s writing without underplaying the rhythmic content, and his phrasing on "Mariá" and "Para Elis" leaves one wondering why those ballads aren't better known", according to J.D. Cosidine.

In December 2019, Feldman hosted a Jam Session at the Art Boutiki, his first connection with the US West Coast Jazz scene.

Discography

As band leader or soloist
 2009: O Som do Beco Das Garrafas
 2014: Piano
 2016: Horizonte featuring Toninho Horta and Raul de Souza
 2018: Horizonte Horizonte (Ao Vivo no Blue Note Rio)

With Joca Perpignan
 2008: Entreventos Piano, production and arrangements

With Duduka da Fonseca Trio
2011: Plays Toninho Horta Piano
2013: New Samba Jazz Directions Piano
2015: Jive Samba Piano
2018: Plays Dom Salvador Piano

With Paulo Levi
2013: Between 2 Thoughts Piano

With Paula Morelenbaum
2008: Telecoteco Piano

With Scott Feiner
2008: Dois Mundos Piano, Production, Latin Grammy Awards of 2009 Nominee

With Achinoam Nini
2015: Love Medicine Piano

With Adam Dunning
2012: Glass Bottom Boat Piano

With Yotam Silberstein
2011: Brasil Piano

With Ensemble PHOENIX
2003: Wind and Sea Arrangements

References

External links

David Feldman official website
David Feldman official blog (in Portuguese)
David Feldman Facebook Artist page
David Feldman official YouTube channel
David Feldman official MySpace page 

1977 births
Bossa nova pianists
Brazilian jazz pianists
Israeli jazz pianists
Brazilian jazz composers
Israeli composers
Living people
Musicians from Rio de Janeiro (city)
The New School alumni
21st-century pianists